A Pareto chart is a type of chart that contains both bars and a line graph, where individual values are represented in descending order by bars, and the cumulative total is represented by the line.  The chart is named for the Pareto principle, which, in turn, derives its name from Vilfredo Pareto, a noted Italian economist.

Description 
The left vertical axis is the frequency of occurrence, but it can alternatively represent cost or another important unit of measure.  The right vertical axis is the cumulative percentage of the total number of occurrences, total cost, or total of the particular unit of measure. Because the values are in decreasing order, the cumulative function is a concave function. To take the example below, in order to lower the amount of late arrivals by 78%, it is sufficient to solve the first three issues.

The purpose of the Pareto chart is to highlight the most important among a (typically large) set of factors. In quality control, Pareto charts are useful to find the defects to prioritize in order to observe the greatest overall improvement. It often represents the most common sources of defects, the highest occurring type of defect, or the most frequent reasons for customer complaints, and so on. Wilkinson (2006) 
devised an algorithm for producing statistically based acceptance limits (similar to confidence intervals) for each bar in the Pareto chart.

These charts can be generated by simple spreadsheet programs, specialized statistical software tools, and online quality charts generators.

The Pareto chart is one of the seven basic tools of quality control.

See also
Control chart
Histogram
Cumulative distribution function (CDF)
Pareto analysis
Pareto principle
Statistical process control (SPC)

References

Further reading
Hart, K. M., & Hart, R. F. (1989). Quantitative methods for quality improvement. Milwaukee, WI: ASQC Quality Press. Santosh: Pre Press
Juran, J. M. (1962). Quality control handbook. New York: McGraw-Hill.
Juran, J. M., & Gryna, F. M. (1970). Quality planning and analysis. New York: McGraw-Hill.
Montgomery, D. C. (1985). Statistical quality control. New York: Wiley.
Montgomery, D. C. (1991). Design and analysis of experiments, 3rd ed. New York: Wiley.
Pyzdek, T. (1989). What every engineer should know about quality control. New York: Marcel Dekker.
Vaughn, R. C. (1974). Quality control. Ames, IA: Iowa State Press.

Categorical data
Product management
Quality
Quality control tools
Statistical charts and diagrams
Vilfredo Pareto